HD 174474, also designated as HR 7095 or rarely 35 G. Telescopii, is a solitary white-hued star located in the southern constellation Telescopium. It has an apparent magnitude of 6.17, placing it near the limit for naked eye visibility. At its current distance, HD 174474's brightness is diminished by 0.26 magnitudes due to interstellar dust. It has an absolute magnitude of +1.61.

This is an ordinary A-type main-sequence star with a stellar classification of A2 V. It has double the mass of the Sun and 1.89 times the Sun's radius. HD 174474 is slightly metal deficient with an iron abundance 22% below solar levels ([Fe/H] = −0.11). It is estimated to be 630 million years old based on stellar evolution models from David & Hillenbrand (2015).

References

A-type main-sequence stars
High-proper-motion stars
174474
092676
7095
CD-48 12769
Telescopium (constellation)
Telescopii, 35